Michael Kácha (1874–1940) was a Czech anarchist.

References 

1874 births
1940 deaths
Anarchist writers
Czech anarchists
Journalists from Prague
Czech publishers (people)
Austro-Hungarian anarchists